Arsène Claude Ménard (14 November 1906 – 2 September 1980) was a French high jumper who won a bronze medal at the 1928 Summer Olympics with a jump of . He achieved his personal best of  that same year in Dairen.

References

1980 deaths
1906 births
French male high jumpers
Olympic athletes of France
Olympic bronze medalists for France
Athletes (track and field) at the 1928 Summer Olympics
Athletes (track and field) at the 1932 Summer Olympics
Sportspeople from Indre-et-Loire
Medalists at the 1928 Summer Olympics
Olympic bronze medalists in athletics (track and field)
20th-century French people